Daniel Chabrera Ríos (born 17 February 1992) more commonly known as Dani, is a professional Spanish footballer turned coach who played and coaches as a goalkeeper.

Fallecido 16 de diciembre de 2021

Playing career 
Dani was scouted as a goalkeeper at the young age of 11 by Spanish side Villarreal CF. It would be with this team that Dani dedicated 18 years of his professional career. Dani progressed through the academy with Villarreal CF as a player between 2001–2013. Along with teammate Marcos Senna, Dani was awarded ‘The Yellow Submarine’ (a symbol of Villarreal CF), a prestigious award given to players marking 10 years with the club.

Coaching career 

In 2013, Dani decided to turn his talent into coaching and became goalkeeper coach for Villarreal CF. Again, showing his talent for coaching, Dani was promoted to coordinator and coached the C, B and eventually First Team.
During the summer of 2018, Dani was asked to coach the India national U-21 football team during the International Football Tournament COTIF.

In 2018, Dani's talent was noticed by Portuguese football coach Hélder Cristóvão, who met with Dani and asked him to join him and a team of four other coaching staff in Saudi Arabia to be goalkeeper coach and coordinator for Al-Nassr FC.
After a successful season and winning both the Saudi Professional League and U-21s League, fellow Saudi club Ettifaq FC requested Dani and his coaching staff to coach their final few remaining matches of the season to avoid relegation; the change saved the team from relegation. 

In October 2019, Dani began working for Real Madrid C.F International Department as goalkeeper coach until he moved back to foreign football. 
Dani currently coaches P.F.C Lokomotiv first team and is the coordinator of the academy.

Additionally, Dani organises and coaches annual International Football Camps and lectures football coaching seminars across Spain.

References 

 Villarreal honors Marcos Senna
 Villarreal former players team
 Dani Chabrera goes to Al-Nassr
 Dani Chabrera, former Villarreal player and coach, wins the Arabian League with Al-Nassr
 Dani Chabrera at Football Emotion
 Dani Chabrera at Profutcamps
 Dani Chabrera at Costa de la Luz Football Campus
 Dani Chabrera, goalkeeper's teacher at ANEFF
 Dani Chabrera visits his born city town hall after winning Arabian League with Al-Nassr

Living people
Spanish footballers
1992 births
Villarreal CF players
Association football goalkeepers